SMS Prinz Eugen was an ironclad warship built for the Austro-Hungarian Navy in the 1870s, the third and final member of the . The ship was supposedly the same vessel that had been laid down in 1861, and had simply been reconstructed. In reality, the head of the Austro-Hungarian Navy could not secure funding for new ships, but reconstruction projects were uncontroversial, so he "rebuilt" the three earlier s. Only the engines and parts of the armor plate were reused in the new Prinz Eugen, which was laid down in October 1874, launched in September 1877, and commissioned in November 1878. The ship spent significant periods out of service, in part due to slender naval budgets that prevented much active use. In 1880, she took part in an international naval demonstration against the Ottoman Empire, and she went to Spain in 1888 for the Barcelona Universal Exposition. Prinz Eugen was stricken in 1904 and converted into a repair ship in 1906–1909. She was renamed Vulkan and served in this capacity through World War I; after the war, she was seized by Italy but was awarded to Yugoslavia in the postwar peace negotiations. Italy refused to hand the ship over, however, and her ultimate fate is unknown.

Design

She displaced . As was common for ironclads of the period, she had a pronounced ram bow. She had a crew of 400 officers and men.

Her propulsion system consisted of one single-expansion marine steam engine that drove a single screw propeller. The number and type of her coal-fired boilers have not survived, but they were vented through a single funnel placed slightly forward of amidships. The ship was fitted with a three-masted sailing rig to supplement the steam engines.

Prinz Eugen was a casemate ship, and she was armed with a main battery of eight  20-caliber (cal.) guns manufactured by Krupp, mounted in a central casemate, four on each broadside. She also carried four  24-cal. guns, two  15-cal. landing guns, six  35-cal. quick-firing guns, three  Hotchkiss revolver cannon, and two  guns. Prinz Eugen also had four  torpedo tubes, one in the bow, one in the stern, and one on each broadside.

Service history

Prinz Eugen was laid down at the Pola Naval Arsenal in October 1874. The ship was ostensibly the same vessel that had been laid down in 1861, as the Austro-Hungarian parliament had approved a so-called reconstruction program of that . The head of the Austro-Hungarian Navy, Vice Admiral Friedrich von Pöck, had resorted to subterfuge to circumvent parliamentary hostility to new ironclad construction; he requested funds to modernize the earlier vessel, but in fact, he had that vessel broken up, with only the machinery, parts of the armor plate, and other miscellaneous equipment being incorporated into the new ship. Her completed hull was launched on 7 September 1877 and fitting-out work was completed by November 1878, when she was commissioned into the fleet. Sea trials began on 9 November.

The government placed a low priority on naval activities, particularly in the 1870s; as a result, the shortage of funds precluded an active fleet policy. The ironclad fleet, including Prinz Eugen, was kept out of service in Pola, laid up in reserve; the only vessels to see significant service in the 1870s were several screw frigates sent abroad. In 1880, Prinz Eugen had her sailing rig reduced. That year, Prinz Eugen, the ironclad , and the unarmored frigate  took part in an international naval demonstration against the Ottoman Empire to force the Ottomans to transfer the city of Ulcinj to Montenegro in accordance with the terms of the 1878 Congress of Berlin. From 6 June to 11 July 1887, Prinz Eugen served as the flagship of the summer training squadron. During this period, Prinz Eugen was present during a fleet review held for Kaiser Franz Josef I on 4 July.

This was the largest squadron of the Austro-Hungarian Navy that had operated outside the Adriatic. In June and July 1889, Prinz Eugen participated in fleet training exercises, which also included the ironclads Custoza, Tegetthoff, Kaiser Max, and Don Juan d'Austria. She took part in the exercises held in May and June 1891.

A new construction program in the late 1890s and early 1900s required the Austro-Hungarian Navy to discard old, obsolete vessels to reduce annual budgets. These ships were largely reused in secondary roles. On 30 December 1904, Prinz Eugen was stricken from the naval register and converted into a repair ship. Conversion work was begun in 1906, which included removing her armament and engines and the installation of a crane that had been removed from the pre-dreadnought battleship . On 16 June 1910, the protected cruiser  towed Vulkan to Šibenik, where she was based for the rest of her career through World War I. After Austria-Hungary's defeat, the ship was seized by Italy in 1919 as a war prize. The postwar negotiations that followed the Treaty of Saint-Germain-en-Laye, which allocated the ships of the former Austro-Hungarian Navy to the Allies, awarded the ship to Yugoslavia, but Italy never transferred the ship. Her ultimate fate is unknown.

Notes

References
 
 
 
 
 
 

Kaiser Max-class ironclads (1875)
1877 ships